The Volta River is the main river system in the West African country of Ghana. It flows south into Ghana from the Bobo-Dioulasso highlands of Burkina Faso. The main parts of the river are the Black Volta, the White Volta, and the Red Volta. In the northwest, the Black Volta forms the international borders between the Ivory Coast, Ghana, and Burkina Faso. The Volta flows southward along the Akwapim-Togoland highlands, and it empties into the Atlantic Ocean at the Gulf of Guinea at Ada Foah. It has a smaller tributary river, the Oti, which enters Ghana from Togo in the east. The Volta River has been dammed at Akosombo for the purpose of generating hydroelectricity. The reservoir named Lake Volta stretches from Akosombo Dam in the south to the northern part of the country, and is the largest man-made reservoir by area in the world.

Volta was named by the Portuguese, meaning twist or turn. The country of Burkina Faso was formerly called Upper Volta, after the river.

The reservoir
Lake Volta is a reservoir impounded by the Akosombo Dam on the lower Volta River in southern Ghana. It is one of the largest reservoirs in the world.

The dam's power plant generates electricity for the Volta River Authority, and the reservoir also provides water transport routes. It is a resource for irrigation and fish farming.

The Volta River is crossed by the Adome Bridge just below the Akosombo Dam.

History
The Volta River was named by Portuguese gold traders in Ghana. It was their farthest extent of exploration before returning (volta is Portuguese for "twist" or "turn"). "River of return" (perhaps because it was where ships turned around and headed for home) or “river of the bend”, in reference to its curved course.

See also
Impacts of the Akosombo Hydroelectric Project — environmental and human health issues from the Akosombo Dam and Lake Volta.

References

External links  
 

 
Rivers of Ghana
Rivers of Burkina Faso
Gulf of Guinea
Rivers of Ivory Coast